The mayor is the highest elected official in Trois-Rivières, in the Mauricie region of Quebec.  Since its incorporation in 1845, the city has had thirty-six mayors.

The mayor presides over the Trois-Rivières City Council.

List

This is a list of mayors of the city of Trois-Rivières.

Officially, elections to the Trois-Rivières Council are on a non-partisan basis.

Footnotes

References
 Cournoyer, Jean. La Mémoire du Québec (2001 edition). Les Éditions internationales Alain Stanké (Montreal). .

Trois-Rivieres